Novoraychikhinsk is an urban locality (a work settlement) under the administrative jurisdiction of Progress Urban Okrug in Amur Oblast, Russia. Population:

References

Urban-type settlements in Amur Oblast
Progress, Amur Oblast